Winner Takes All is a 1918 American silent Western film directed by Elmer Clifton and starring Monroe Salisbury, Alfred Allen and Betty Schade.

Cast
 Monroe Salisbury as Alan MacDonald
 Alfred Allen as Saul Chadron
 Betty Schade as Nola Chadron
 Helen Jerome Eddy as Frances Landcrafe
 Sam De Grasse as Mark Thorne
 Jack Nelson as Banjo Gibson

References

Bibliography
 James Robert Parish & Michael R. Pitts. Film directors: a guide to their American films. Scarecrow Press, 1974.

External links
 

1918 films
1918 Western (genre) films
1910s English-language films
American black-and-white films
Universal Pictures films
Films directed by Elmer Clifton
Silent American Western (genre) films
1910s American films